= Vanbot =

- Origin: Stockholm, Sweden
- Genres: Electropop
- Years active: 2011–present
- Members: Ester Ideskog, Sebastian Forslund

Vanbot, born Ester Ideskog, is an electronic music artist from Sweden.

== History ==
Vanbot released her self-titled debut album on April 15, 2011. She performed at SXSW on March 15, 2012. She released her second album, "Perfect Storm," in 2015.

== Reception ==
Her song "Got To Get Out" was on the list of "5 Must-Hear Pop Songs of the Week!" for the week of February 29, 2012 on the MTV Buzzworthy Blog. The song was also described as "thrilling" and "deceptively upbeat", although another reviewer called her album "lackluster".

Reviewers frequently compare her to fellow Swedish musician Robyn.
